Claire Guion-Firmin (née Javois; born 6 September 1957) is a French Saint Martinois politician. She was elected to the French National Assembly on 18 June 2017, representing the department of Saint Barthélemy and Saint Martin.

Ahead of the 2022 presidential elections, Guion-Firmin publicly declared her support for Michel Barnier as the Republicans’ candidate.

She lost her seat in the first round of the 2022 French legislative election.

References

Living people
1957 births
Deputies of the 15th National Assembly of the French Fifth Republic
Members of the Territorial Council of Saint Martin
Saint Martinois women in politics
Saint Martinois politicians
21st-century French women politicians
Black French politicians
Members of Parliament for Saint Barthélemy and Saint Martin